Cubilin is a protein that in humans is encoded by the CUBN gene.

Function 

Cubilin (CUBN) acts as a receptor for intrinsic factor-vitamin B12 complexes. The role of receptor is supported by the presence of 27 CUB domains. Cubilin shows a restricted mode of expression according to protein profiling and transcriptomics analyses, and is essentially only present in the kidneys and small intestine.  Mutations in CUBN may play a role in autosomal recessive megaloblastic anemia. A complex of amnionless and cubilin forms the cubam receptor.

Clinical significance 
Cubilin is a potential diagnostic and prognostic cancer biomarker for kidney cancer. Based on patient survival data, high levels of cubilin in tumor cells is a favourable prognostic biomarker in renal cell carcinoma.

References

Further reading

External links